Southampton Athletic Club is an athletics club based in Southampton, England.  It is based at the Southampton Sports Centre.
 It's men compete in the British Athletics League National Division One and women in UK Women's Athletic League Division 1. The club also completes in the Southern Athletics League.

History
Southampton Athletic Club was formed after a merger of Team Southampton and Southampton Running Club in 2010. Those parent clubs themselves having been formed from mergers involving Southampton City Athletics Club, Team Solent, Southampton and Eastleigh AC, Eastleigh Athletic Club and Southampton Amateur Athletic club.

Honours

Notable Athletes

Olympians

References

External links
 Official club website
 Southampton Sports Centre

Athletics clubs in England